Misho (born 1984) is an Armenian rapper.

Misho may also refer to:

 Mishō, Ehime, Japan
 Seiryū-Shin-Iwakuni Station, originally Mishō Station, a railway station
 Misho Shamara, or Big Sha, Mihail Stanislavov Mihaylov (born 1972), Bulgarian rapper

See also
Names of which Misho can be a shortened form in some Slavic languages:
Mihail
Mihael
Miroslav (given name)
Dimitar